This is the discography for American band We Are Scientists. They have released eight studio albums, five EPs, one compilation album and many singles, amongst various other releases.

Albums

Studio albums

Other albums

EPs

Singles

Soundtrack appearances
 "Ode to Star L23" appears in the 2007 film I'll Believe You
 "Nobody Move, Nobody Get Hurt" has been featured in:
 The CSI: NY episode "Stuck On You"
 An episode of MTV show The Hills
 A scene in the How I Met Your Mother episode "Belly Full of Turkey" (season 1, episode 9)
 "Inaction" has been featured in:
 An episode of The O.C.
 The Greek episode "Hazed and Confused"
 The video game Pure
 "The Great Escape" has been featured in:
 A preview for the MTV show Maui Fever
 The video games Burnout Revenge and Burnout Legends
 Adverts for Sky Sports
 A montage of the Best Movie nominees at the 2007 MTV Movie Awards
 "Lousy Reputation" is featured in the video game SSX On Tour
 "Callbacks" is featured on the video game True Crime: New York City
 "After Hours" has been featured in:
 The background of a Sony commercial
 The movie Nick and Norah's Infinite Playlist, as well as its trailer and official soundtrack
 "Rules Don't Stop" is featured in the video game FIFA 11 and Dirt 3

References

External links
 Official website

Discographies of American artists
Rock music group discographies